Mechanics, also called Mechanical Problems or Questions of Mechanics, is a text traditionally attributed to  Aristotle, but generally regarded as spurious. Thomas Winter has suggested that the author was Archytas. However, Michael Coxhead says that it is only possible to conclude that the author was one of the Peripatetics.

During the Renaissance, an edition of this work was published by Francesco Maurolico. A Latin translation was made by Vettor Fausto, dedicated to Giovanni Badoer in 1517.

See also
Aristotle's wheel paradox

Notes

External links 
 
 Pseudo-Aristotle, Mechanica - Greek text and English translation
 

Works by Aristotle
Ancient Greek technology